Marek Chojnacki  (born 6 December 1959) is a Polish former footballer who played as a defender. He went on to become a manager.

Club career
Chojnacki played for ŁKS Łódź in the Polish Ekstraklasa, appearing in more than 450 league matches. He had a spell in the Greek Super League with Ethnikos Piraeus F.C.

International career
Chojnacki played for Poland at the 1979 FIFA World Youth Championship in Japan. He played 4 international matches for his country.

References

External links

 

1959 births
Living people
Footballers from Łódź
Polish footballers
Polish expatriate footballers
Poland international footballers
ŁKS Łódź players
Ethnikos Piraeus F.C. players
Ekstraklasa players
Super League Greece players
Expatriate footballers in Greece
Polish football managers
Odra Opole managers
ŁKS Łódź managers
Arka Gdynia managers
Zagłębie Sosnowiec managers

Association football defenders